The Cuban pink amphisbaena (Amphisbaena carlgansi) is a species of worm lizard in the family Amphisbaenidae. The species is endemic to Cuba.

Etymology
The specific name, carlgansi, is in honor of American herpetologist Carl Gans.

Habitat

Reproduction
A. carlgansi is oviparous.

References

Further reading
Gans C (2005). "Checklist and Bibliography of the Amphisbaenia of the World". Bulletin of the American Museum of Natural History (289): 1–130. (Amphisbaena carlgansi, p. 12).
Thomas R, Hedges SB (1998). "A New Amphisbaenian from Cuba". Journal of Herpetology 32 (1): 92–96. (Amphisbaena carlgansi, new species).

Amphisbaena (lizard)
Reptiles described in 1998
Taxa named by Richard Thomas (herpetologist)
Taxa named by Stephen Blair Hedges
Endemic fauna of Cuba
Reptiles of Cuba